The 1977–78 Allsvenskan was the 44th season of the top division of Swedish handball. 12 teams competed in the league. Ystads IF won the regular season, but HK Drott won the playoffs and claimed their second Swedish title. IFK Lidingö and IF Saab were relegated.

League table

Playoffs

Semifinals
 HK Drott−IK Heim 23−22, 29−21 (HK Drott advance to the finals)
 LUGI−Ystads IF 16−14, 17−16 (LUGI advance to the finals)

Finals
 HK Drott−LUGI 19−18, 23−18 (HK Drott champions)

References 

Swedish handball competitions